Akoğlu Island, known in Greek as Kópanos (Κόπανος), is a Turkish islet in the Aegean Sea.

It had a number of names in history such as Armutçuk, Kedi, Kópanos and Vrachonisída. Its dimensions are 78 x 57 m (260 x 190 ft) 
Administratively it is a part of Ayvalık ilçe (district) of Balıkesir Province .It is an uninhabited island .

References

Islands of Balıkesir Province
Ayvalık
Islands of Turkey
Aegean islands